Brimfield Township may refer to the following townships in the United States:

 Brimfield Township, Peoria County, Illinois
 Brimfield Township, Portage County, Ohio